Florian is a unisex given name borrowed from the ancient Roman name .

It is the name of a patron saint of Poland and the patron saint of Upper Austria. Florian (or a local equivalent) remains a common name in Austria, Germany, Switzerland, Spain, France, the Netherlands, Belgium, and Poland.

Variants

 Florian – German, Polish, French, Romanian
 Floriano – Italian, Portuguese
  – Latin
  – Spanish
  – Hungarian
 Florijan/Florjan – Slovene
  – French
  – Spanish
  – Italian
  – Romanian
  – Albanian
  – Latin
  – Romansch
  – Russian
  – Bulgarian

Given name
 Saint Florian, a 4th-century martyr in the Roman Empire, patron of firemen
 Florian Abel, a 16th-century Austrian painter
 Anton Florian of Liechtenstein (1656–1721), an early prince of Liechtenstein
 Florian Abrahamowicz (born 1961), an Austrian priest
 Florian Andrighetto (born 1953), an Australian politician
 Florian Armstrong (born 1971), birth name of Dido, a British singer
 Florian Bague (born 1984), a French football goalkeeper
 Florian Ballhaus (born 1965), a German cinematographer
 Florian Bellanger (born 1968), a French pastry chef, TV personality
 Florian Berisha (born 1990), a Kosovan football midfielder
 Florian Bertmer, a German illustrator
 Florian Biesik (born 1849), an Austro-Hungarian Wymysorys linguist
Florian Bollen, chairman of Great Wheel Corporation and Singapore Flyer
 Florian Boucansaud (born 1981), a French  football defender
 Florian Bruns (born 1979), a German football midfielder
 Florian Côté (1929–2002), a Québécois politician
 Florian Cajori (born 1859), a Swiss-American historian of mathematics
 Florian Cazalot (born 1985), a rugby union player
 Florian Ceynowa (1817–1881), a Kashubian political activist and linguist
 Florian Chmielewski (born 1927), a Minnesota Senate president 
 Florian Clara (born 1988), an Italian luger
 Florian Dan Lăcustă (born 1977), a Romanian footballer
 Florian Johann Deller (1729–1773), an Austrian composer and violinist
 Florian Dick (born 1984), a German football defender
 Florian Dinhopel (born 1987), an Austrian ice hockey player
 Florian Eisath (born 1984), an Italian alpine ski racer
 Florian-Ayala Fauna, an American musician
 Florian Fricke (1944–2001), a German musician
 Florian Fritsch (born 1985), a German golfer
 Florian Fritz (born 1984), a French rugby union footballer
 Florian Fromlowitz (born 1986), a German footballer
 Florian Gallenberger (born 1972), a German film director
 Stefan Florian Garczyński (1805–1833), a Polish Romantic poet, a Messianist
 Florian Geyer (Geier) (1490–1525), a Franconian nobleman, diplomat and knight
 Florian Goebel (1972–2008), a German astrophysicist
 Florian Gosch (born 1980), an Austrian beach volleyball player
 Florian Grassl (born 1980), a German skeleton racer
 Florian Gruber (born 1983), a German auto racing driver
 Florian Grzechowiak (1914–1972), a Polish basketball player
 Florian Guay, a Québécois politician
 Florian Habicht (born 1975), a New Zealand film director
 Florian Hart (born 1990), an Austrian footballer
 Florian Havemann (born 1952), the son of East German dissident Robert Havemann
 Florian Hecker, a German electronic music composer
 Florian Heller (born 1982), a German football player
 Johann Florian Heller (1813–1871), an Austrian chemist, a founder of clinical chemistry
 Florian Henckel von Donnersmarck (born 1973), an Austrian-German director and screenwriter
 Florian Homm (born 1959), a German financier
 Florian Hube (born 1980), a German football player
 Florian Hufsky (1986–2009), an Austrian new media artist, political activist
 Florian Iberer (born 1982), an Austrian ice hockey player
 Florian Jarjat (born 1980), a French football player
 Florian Jenni (born 1980), a Swiss chess player
 Florian Jungwirth (born 1989), a German footballer 
 Florian Just (born 1982), a German pair skater
 Florian Kehrmann (born 1977), a German handball player
 Florian Keller (born 1981), a German field hockey player
 Florian Kempf (born 1956), an American football player
 Florian Klein (born 1986), an Austrian football player 
 Florian Koch (born 1992), a German basketball player
 Florian Kohfeldt (born 1982), a German football manager
 Florian Kringe (born 1982), a German footballer
 Florian Lampert (1863–1930), an American politician
 Florian Lechner (born 1981), a German football player
 Florian Leopold Gassmann (1729–1774), a German-speaking Bohemian opera composer
 Florian Liegl (born 1983), an Austrian ski jumper 
 Florian Lucchini, a French footballer
 Florian Müller (disambiguation), several people
 Florian Mader (born 1982), an Austrian  association football player
 Florian Maier-Aichen (born 1973), a German landscape photographer
 Florian Marange (born 1986), a French football defender
 Florian Marciniak (1915–1944), a Polish scoutmaster
 Florian Marinescu, a Romanian sprint canoer
 Florian Maurice (born 1974), a French former football player
 Florian Mayer (born 1983), a German tennis player 
 Florian Metz (born 1985), an Austrian footballer
 Florian Meyer (born 1968), a German football referee
 Florian Mohr (born 1984), a German footballer
 Florian Myrtaj (born 1976), an Albanian footballer
 Florian Neuhold (born 1993), an Austrian footballer
 Florian Philippot (born 1981), a French politician
 Florian Picasso (born 1990), a French DJ and descendant of Pablo Picasso
 Florian Pilkington-Miksa (1950–2021), an English drummer
 Florian Pittiș (1943–2007), a Romanian actor
 Florian Pop, a Romanian mathematician
 Florian Porcius (1816–1906), Austro-Hungarian Romanian botanist
 Florian Prantl, an Austrian luger
 Florian Quintilla (born 1988), French rugby league footballer
 Hieronim Florian Radziwiłł (1715–1760), a Polish-Lithuanian szlachcic
 Florian Riedel (born 1990), a German footballer 
 Florian Roost (born 1989), a Swiss ice dancer
 Florian Rousseau (born 1974), a French track cyclist 
 Florian Rus (born 1989), a Romanian singer and songwriter 
 Florian Süssmayr (born 1963), a German painter 
 Florian Schönbeck (born 1974), a German decathlete
 Florian Schabereiter (born 1991), an Austrian ski jumper 
 Florian Schneider (1947–2020), a German electronic musician
 Florian Schulz, a German photographer
 Florian Schwarthoff (born 1968), a German hurdler
 Florian Seidl (born 1979), an Austrian vehicle designer
 Florian Seitz (born 1982), a German sprinter
 Florian Silbereisen (born 1981), a German musician and television presenter 
 Florian Siwicki (born 1925), a Polish politician
 Florian Skilang Temengil (born 1986), a Palauan wrestler 
 Florian Slotawa (born 1972), a German conceptual artist
 Florian Stablewski (1841–1906), a Polish priest and politician
 Florian Stahel (born 1985), a Swiss footballer 
 Florian Stalder (born 1982), a Swiss racing cyclist 
 Florian Stengg (born 1989), an Austrian skier
 Florian Sturm (born 1982), an Austrian footballer
 Florian Ștefănescu-Goangă (1881–1958), a Romanian psychologist
 Florian Święs (born 1939), a Polish geobiologist
 Florian Thauvin (born 1993), a French football player 
 Florian Thorwart (born 1982), a German football player
 Florian Tschögl, an Austrian "righteous among the Nations"
 Florian Uhlig (born 1974), a German pianist
 Florian Ungler (died 1536), a Bavarian printer
 Florian Vijent (1961–1989), a Dutch-Surinamese football goalkeeper
 Florian Vogel (disambiguation): several people
 Florian Wanner (born 1978), a German judoka
 Florian Wiek, a German pianists
 Ernst Florian Winter (born 1923), an Austrian-American historian and political scientist
 Florian ZaBach (1918–2006), an American musician and TV personality
 Florian Zeller (born 1979), a French novelist and playwright
 Florian Zellhofer (born 1988), an Austrian footballer
 Florian Zimmer, a German magician
 Florian Znaniecki (1882–1958), a Polish sociologist

Surname
 Aaron Florian (1805–1887), a Romanian historian
 Dawid Florian (born 1982), a Polish footballer
 Federico De Florian (born 1921), an Italian skier
 Filip Florian (born 1968), a Romanian author
 Friedrich Karl Florian (1894–1975), the Gauleiter of Düsseldorf in Nazi Germany
 Friedrich St. Florian (born 1932), an Austrian-American architect
 Jean-Pierre Claris de Florian (1755–1794), a French poet and romance writer
 Josef Florian (1873–1941), a Czech publisher and translator
 Juan José Florian (born  1982), Colombian para cyclist
 Kenny Florian (born 1976), a Peruvian-American mixed martial artist
 Mircea Florian (1888–1960), a Romanian philosopher
 Mircea Florian (born 1949), a Romanian singer and multimedia artist
 Rick Florian (born 1962), an American musician, songwriter and producer
 Teodor Florian (born 1899), a Romanian rugby union footballer

Fictional characters
 Florian, the male protagonist of Pokémon Scarlet and Violet
 Florian, the protagonist of Florian: The Emperor’s Stallion by Felix Salten
 Florian, the protagonist of Gorgeous Carat manga
 Florian, a prominent character in the novel Cyteen by C. J. Cherryh
Florian Brandner, on the German soap opera Verbotene Liebe
 Florian Cravic, also known as Bernie Crane, a character in the video game Grand Theft Auto IV
 Florean Fortescue, a shopkeeper in the Harry Potter universe
Florian Reiss, in the manga Attack on Titan

See also
 Florian (disambiguation)

References

German masculine given names
Dutch masculine given names
French masculine given names
Polish masculine given names
Romanian masculine given names
Romanian-language surnames